The Saida Municipal Stadium, also known as the Martyr Rafic Hariri Stadium, is a 22,600 capacity multi-purpose stadium in Sidon, Lebanon.

The stadium was built in 1999 on the expanded grounds of the old stadium, as one of the venues to host matches during the 2000 AFC Asian Cup that was held in Lebanon. It is currently mostly used for local and international football matches. The stadium also has athletics facilities.

References

External links

StadiumDB images

AFC Asian Cup stadiums
Football venues in Lebanon
Sports venues in Lebanon
Multi-purpose stadiums in Lebanon